Ota Ulč (16 March 1930 – 22 November 2022) was a Czech-American author and columnist.

Ulč studied law at the Charles University in Prague, then became a district court judge in Stříbro. In 1959 he escaped via West Berlin to the West and finally to the U.S. There he proceeded to study political science at the Columbia University in New York. Afterwards, he gave classes on comparative governments at Binghamton University.

His books were published by Škvorecký's 68 Publishers in Toronto. From 1989 to his death, Ulč published about 20 books and articles in both printed and online newspapers in the Czech Republic.

As of 2006, Ulč was living in Binghamton, in upstate New York. He died on 22 November 2022, at the age of 92.

Publications 
 Judge in a Communist State, Ohio University Press, 1972
 Politics in Czechoslovakia, San Francisco:W.H.Freeman, 1974
 Malá doznání okresního soudce, Sixty-Eight Publishers, Toronto, 1974 
 Náš člověk v Indii a na Ceyloně, Sixty-Eight Publishers, Toronto, 1976
 Antinostalgicum, Sixty-Eight Publishers, Toronto, 1977
 Bez Čedoku po Pacifiku, Sixty-Eight Publishers, Toronto, 1980
 Špatně časovaný běženec, Sixty-Eight Publishers, Toronto, 1985
 Bez Čedoku po Jižní Africe, Sixty-Eight Publishers, Toronto, 1988
 Šťastně navrácený běženec, Sixty-Eight Publishers, Toronto, 1992
 My  oni, Polygon Verlag, Zurich, (1.ed.1987, 2.ed.1989)
 Malá doznání okresního soudce, Art-servis, Prague, 1990
 Nástin přednášek mezinárodního práva, Univerzita Palackého, Olomouc, 1991
 Příručka pro zájemce o americký svět, Rozmluvy, Prague, 1992
 Bez Čedoku po Číně a okolí, Ivo Železný, Prague, 1992
 Bez Čedoku po Jižní Africe, Ivo Železný, Prague, 1992
 Naši mezi protinožci, Faun, Prague, 1998
 Běženec v sametu, Faun, Prague, 1998
 Vandrování po Pacifiku  Oceánii, Olympia, Prague, 1998
 Všehochuť málo korektní Doplněk, Brno 2002
 Kam šlápne česká noha, Šulc, Prague, 2003,
 Pacifik: ostrovní komunikace a lidožroutská tradice, Šulc, Prague, 2004
 Čech částečným Číňanem, Academia, Prague, 2004
 Klokánie  obtížné sousedství: piráti, lovci lebek, novodobí teroristé, Šulc, Prague, 2006

References

External links
 Ota Ulc: from morose nihilism to a New York professorship (in English)
 Ulč's website (in Czech)

1930 births
2022 deaths
Czech male writers
Czechoslovak judges
Czechoslovak emigrants to the United States
Charles University alumni
Columbia Graduate School of Arts and Sciences alumni
Binghamton University faculty
Writers from Plzeň